Kurnik ("chicken pirog"), also known as wedding pirog or tsar pirog, is a dome-shaped savoury Russian pirog usually filled with chicken or turkey, eggs, onions, kasha or rice, and other optional components. Sometimes filled with boiled rooster combs, this pirog originated in Southern Russia, especially in Cossack communities, and was used as a "wedding pirog" in the rest of the country. It is dome-shaped, unlike any other non-sweet pirog. In special cases, it was served to tsar himself. Even today, this pirog is served on special occasions in most of Russia.

Customs
For a wedding, kurniks were made for both spouses. The groom's pirog was decorated with figures of people representing the strength of the young family. The bride, on the other hand, had her kurnik decorated with flowers, said to represent beauty and kindness.

See also
 List of pies, tarts and flans
 List of Russian dishes

References

Russian chicken dishes
Savoury pies